The Homathko Icefield is an icefield in British Columbia, Canada. The Lillooet Icecap and the Compton Névé, both similar in size to the Homathko Icefield but much more peak-studded, lie to the Homathko Icefield's southeast across the Southgate River which bends around the icefield-massif's southern flank to reach the head of Bute Inlet adjacent to the mouth of the Homathko River. The icefield is essentially one large ice-girt montane plateau between these two rivers.

The highest summit of the icefield is Mount Grenville, located at its southern edge.  Among its other peaks are Plateau Peak, Cambridge Peak, Cloister Peak, Galleon Peak and, on its northwest overlooking the site of the opening battle of the Chilcotin War, Klattasine Peak, named for the Tsilhqot'in leader of the war.  Just northeast of the icefield is Mount Queen Bess, the second-highest summit in the Pacific Ranges, and to the icefield's east is Mount Good Hope; near it, and within the icefield, are peaks whose names continue the Elizabethan theme - Burghley Peak, Howard Peak, and Walsingham Peak, named after soldiers and statesmen of that era.

Homathko is a derivation of Homalco or Homalhco or Homalhko, who are a subgroup of the Mainland Comox whose territory includes Bute and Toba Inlets.

See also
List of glaciers
Pacific Ranges
Lillooet Icecap
Ha-Iltzuk Icefield

References

External links

Glaciers of the Pacific Ranges
Landforms of the Chilcotin
Ice fields of British Columbia